William George Picton Wrathall (1931, in Auckland – 1995) was a cartoonist for the New Zealand Truth newspaper from 1976 to 1991. His work also appeared in the Weekly News,  New Zealand Listener, and the Sunday Times. As well as editorial cartoons, he produced several comic strips, including Godzone for the New Zealand Listener and Pioneer Go Home for Truth (from 1974).

Publications 
 Pioneer Go Home! (1976). Wellington, INL Print.
 Korero Māori. Series A (1973). Auckland, Heinemann Educational Books (as illustrator).
 Korero Māori. Series B (1974). Auckland, Heinemann Educational Books (as illustrator).

Exhibitions 
 Theatre 87 (5-9 July 1976)
 A bit of cheek: the many faces of Muldoon (National Library of New Zealand, 1994)

References 

New Zealand cartoonists
People from Auckland
New Zealand satirists
1931 births
1995 deaths